We're Coming Back (Finnish: Me tulemme taas) is a 1953 Finnish musical comedy film directed by Armand Lohikoski and starring Tuija Halonen,  Tapio Rautavaara and Siiri Angerkoski.

Partial cast
 Tuija Halonen as Satu  
 Tapio Rautavaara as Olli  
 Siiri Angerkoski as Kaisa, the widow  
 Aku Korhonen as Alpertti  
 Anneli Sauli as Katri Karkela  
 Tommi Rinne as Minäpoika, lumberjack  
 Åke Lindman as Kymppi, lumberjack boss  
 Uuno Montonen as Valfriiti  
 Masa Niemi as Reetrikki  
 Veikko Linna as Konsta Karkela  
 Armas Jokio as Jooseppi 
 Kai Lappalainen as Eugen Karkela

References

Bibliography 
 John Sundholm. Historical Dictionary of Scandinavian Cinema. Scarecrow Press, 2012.

External links 
 

1953 films
1953 musical comedy films
Finnish musical comedy films
1950s Finnish-language films
Finnish black-and-white films